Karl Austin (born 7 August 1961) is an English former footballer who played as a goalkeeper for Stafford Rangers, Port Vale and Gresley Rovers in the 1980s.

Career
Austin played for Alliance Premier League club Stafford Rangers, before joining John Rudge's Fourth Division side Port Vale on non-contract terms in February 1985. His rivals for the number one jersey were Barry Siddall and Chris Pearce. He played in a 3–3 draw with Scunthorpe United at the Old Showground on 10 May, the last day of the 1984–85 season, but was not signed to a permanent deal at Vale Park.

Career statistics
Source:

References

1961 births
Living people
Footballers from Stoke-on-Trent
English footballers
Association football goalkeepers
Stafford Rangers F.C. players
Port Vale F.C. players
Gresley F.C. players
National League (English football) players
English Football League players